The Qasr El Nil Bridge (originally named Khedive Ismail Bridge), also commonly spelled Kasr El Nil Bridge, is a historic structure dating from 1931 which replaced the first bridge to span the Nile River in central Cairo, Egypt. It connects Tahrir Square in downtown Cairo to the modern Cairo Opera complex toward the southern end of Gezira Island.  At the bridge's east and west approaches are four large bronze lion statues; they are late 19th-century works by Henri Alfred Jacquemart, French sculptor and animalier. The newer and wider 6th October Bridge parallels its route  just to the north.

Route
Qasr El Nil Street crosses over the Nile on the bridge, from the east bank area Tahrir Square—Liberation Square in downtown Cairo, past the huge Mogamma government building and the headquarters of the Arab League, then onto the Qasr El Nil Bridge over the river to Gezira Island. There it meets Opera Square and the Cairo Opera House, with connections north to the Cairo Tower and the Zamalek district, and south across the island to the Tahrir Bridge across a smaller branch of the Nile to Tahrir Street in the Agouza district on the west bank.

Construction and name

The previous bridge on the site, El Gezira Bridge, was built between 1869 and 1871 by Linant de Bellefonds with the participation of France's Five-Lilles Company. The foundation stone for the present Qasr El Nil Bridge was laid by King Fuad I on February 4, 1931. After over two years of construction, undertaken by Dorman Long & Co. Ltd, King Fuad inaugurated the bridge's opening on June 6, 1933.

The bridge was originally named Khedive Ismail Bridge after King Fuad's father, Khedive Isma'il Pasha. After the Egyptian Revolution of 1952, the bridge was renamed, along with other Egyptian buildings and bridges.  This bridge was renamed Qasr El Nil in Arabic, which translates to Palace of the Nile.

Public use and demonstrations
The Qasr El Nil Bridge is popular for strolling in the evenings.

2011 Egyptian Revolution

The bridge, along with the nearby 6th October Bridge, was a regular site in the 2011 Egyptian revolution for public demonstrations and as a major route east to protest gatherings in Tahrir Square.

Gallery

References

External links

Bridges in Cairo
Bridges over the Nile
Bridges completed in 1933
Downtown Cairo
Gezira Island
Tourist attractions in Cairo